Giles Terera  (born 14 December 1976) is a British actor, musician, and filmmaker. He is best known for his work in the theatre, particularly in the original cast of the London production of the musical Hamilton, as Aaron Burr, for which he won the 2018 Olivier Award for Best Actor in a Musical. His first documentary, Muse of Fire, premiered in autumn 2013.

Career
Giles Terera trained at Mountview Academy of Theatre Arts. After leaving Mountview in 1999, he joined an acting ensemble at the National Theatre, where he appeared in Troilus and Cressida, Candide, and The Darker Face of the Earth. He then went on to star as the Ugly Duckling in Honk!

Since then Terera has appeared consistently in British theatre, and some of his most notable appearances are in London's National Theatre and the West End. They include: Death and the King's Horseman, The Tempest, Sammy Davis, Jr. in The Rat Pack: Live From Las Vegas, RENT, 125th Street, and Jailhouse Rock. He originated the role of Gary Coleman in the London production of Avenue Q.  He also appeared as Mafala Hatimbi in The Book of Mormon.

Terera has been nominated for three awards for the Whatsonstage.com Awards. He was nominated for Best Supporting Actor in a Musical for his appearance in Jailhouse Rock, Best Takeover in a Role for The Rat Pack: Live From Las Vegas as Sammy Davis, Jr., and for Best Ensemble Performance in Avenue Q. His production of Hamlet, in which he played Horatio, won Best Shakespearean Production, and he accepted the award on behalf of the production. In 2007 Terera became the first Black actor to play Christy in Dublin's Abbey Theatre production of Playboy of the Western World. In 2011 he played Caliban in Trevor Nunn's production of The Tempest opposite Ralph Fiennes at Haymarket Theatre. In 2015 and 2016 he appeared at Shakespeare's Globe Theatre, firstly in King John followed by The Merchant Of Venice, a production starring Jonathan Pryce which toured America, China and Italy. In 2016 Terera appeared in the National Theatre's award-winning production of Ma Rainey's Black Bottom, reportedly spending several months learning to play the double bass for the role. In December 2017 he originated the role of Aaron Burr in the London transfer production of Hamilton, a role for which he won an Olivier Award for Best Actor in a Musical in April 2018.

As well as his numerous stage appearances, Terera has made occasional appearances in film and television. His most notable television appearances was in the CBBC programme Horrible Histories, performing in all five series from 2009 to 2013. He has also appeared in BBC television show Doctors, and in the film London Boulevard. He also appeared in a televised production of Hamlet. In 2020 he appeared in a Channel4 television production Maxxx as Gbenga (Maxxx's father).

Terera is also a filmmaker and musician. His first documentary, Muse of Fire, created with Dan Poole, centres on modern perspectives of Shakespeare, featuring interviews with actors and filmmakers such as Judi Dench, Ian McKellen, Jude Law, Julie Taymor, Fiona Shaw and Baz Luhrmann. The film premiered in autumn 2013 on BBC Four.

Terera's credits as a musician, aside from appearing in numerous musical theatre productions, include composing scores for theatre and performing live as a solo musician. He also composed the score for Muse of Fire, and his vocals can be heard in several songs for Horrible Histories.

In 2013, Terera curated and directed a series of events at the National Theatre as part of its 50th-anniversary celebrations entitled "Walk in the Light", which honoured the contribution of Black artists to British theatre.

Terera was appointed Member of the Order of the British Empire (MBE) in the 2020 New Year Honours for services to theatre.

Terera featured as part of London's New Year celebrations for 2022. He opened the celebrations by delivering a poem referencing the impact and achievements made in 2021.

Filmography

Film

Theatre

Awards

References

External links

 Muse of Fire

1976 births
Black British male actors
English composers
English filmmakers
English male musicians
English male stage actors
English people of Guyanese descent
Living people
Male actors from London
Members of the Order of the British Empire